is a passenger railway station located in the city of Miyoshi, Tokushima Prefecture, Japan. It is operated by JR Shikoku and has the station number "D19".

Lines

Layout
The station is located in a deep river ravine with high mountains on both sides. It consists of a side platform serving a single track. A wooden building adjacent to the side platform serves as a passenger waiting room. There is no access road. From the nearest main road, National Route 32, it is necessary to descend by a mountain footpath and then cross the tracks via a pedestrian level crossing in order to reach the station.

The station is on a siding located at a lower level from the main track. There is no through service to the station and a switchback manoeuvre is required to use the station. Trains approaching from   need to enter a siding and then reverse direction and back into the station siding. Trains approaching from Kochi can enter the station siding directly but upon departure, need to execute the switchback, entering a siding and reversing direction before accessing the main track in the direction of Tadotsu.

Adjacent stations

History
At this time the line was known as the Sanyo Line and was operated by Japanese Government Railways (JGR) which later became Japanese National Railways (JNR). The station was upgraded to a passenger station on 1 October 1950. With the privatization of JNR on 1 April 1987, control of the station passed to JR Shikoku.

Surrounding area
Since the station is located in the valley along the Ayukutani River, it cannot be reached by car, and the only way to reach it is on foot, via a 600 meter mountain road to Tokushima Prefectural Road No. 5 . However, the road is little more than a hiking path, often blocked by fallen trees, and there is a risk of falling under the cliff because there is no fence. Also, depending on the season, pit vipers and hornets may appear.

See also
List of railway stations in Japan

References

External links

 JR Shikoku timetable

Railway stations in Tokushima Prefecture
Railway stations in Japan opened in 1950
Miyoshi, Tokushima